Tarawih, also rendered in English as Taraweeh, is derived from the Arabic root ر و ح related to rest and relaxation. Tarawih prayers are special Muslim prayers involving reading long portions of the Quran, as well as performing many rakahs (cycles of movement involved in Islamic prayer). They are exclusive to the Sunni denomination of Islam.

Name variations
 
 
 
 
 
 
 
 
 Indonesian, Malay: salat tarawih, solat tarawih
 
 
Kurdish: نوێژی تەڕاویح, romanized: nwéjī tarâwīḥ

 
 
 
 
 
   romanized</small> Taroveh
 
 
 
 
 
 Afghan Pashto د تراويح لمونځ

Overview
Tarawih prayers begin from the first Moon-sighted evening (start of Ramadan) to second Moon-sighted evening (last day of Ramadan). This prayer is performed in congregation during Ramadan of the Islamic calendar, after Isha (and before Witr, which is also prayed following the imam who leads the prayer aloud in one or three rakats unlike how it is done in other eleven months).

Tarawih prayers are prayed in pairs. According to the Hanafi, Maliki, Shafi' and Hanbali schools of Sunni Islam, the standard number of rakats is twenty referring it to a narration in Muwatta' Imam Malik which said that "In the time of Umar, the people used to offer 20 raka'āt". But it is clearly mentioned in the Muwatta' before the said narration that when Umar assigned duty to Ubay ibn Ka'b and Tamim al-Dari to lead the Tarawih, he ordered them to offer 11 raka'āt (8 of tarawih and 3 of witr). Sunni Muslims believe it is customary to attempt a takmil ("complete recitation" of the Quran) as one of the religious observances of ramadan, by reciting at least one juz' per night in tarawih.

Tarawih prayers are considered optional (sunnah), or in other words, not obligatory. However, it is believed that the reward for them is great. 

Muhammad is reported to have said, “Whoever stands with the imam (in Taraweeh prayer) until he finishes, it is equivalent to spending the whole night in prayer.” This hadith was used as a proof by Imam Ahmad.

Background

The Sunni prayer Tarawih has been mentioned in traditions as Qiyam al-Layl min Ramadan ("Standing of night in Ramadan") and Qiyam al-Ramadan ("Standing of Ramadan"). Some Sunni Muslims regard the Tarawih prayers as Sunnat al-Mu'akkadah. Other Sunni Muslims believe Tarawih is an optional prayer that may be performed at home. According to this tradition Muhammad initially and briefly prayed the Tarawih in congregation during Ramadan, but discontinued this practice out of concern it would be mandated, yet he never forbade it. During the time when Umar was the caliph, he reinstated the praying of Tarawih in congregation.

Shia Muslims regard Tarawih as bid‘ah, introduced after the death of Muhammad by Umar ibn al-Khattab, according to his own words.

A hadith from (Shia) kitab al-kafi: ‘Abu ‘Abdallah, peace be upon him, has said that the Messenger of Allah, peace be upon him and his progeny, would increase his prayer during the month of Ramadan. After Al-‘Atmah (late evening prayer, he would perform more prayers. People behind would stand up (for prayer), but he would go inside and leave them. Then, after he came out, they would come and stand up behind him (for prayer), but he would leave them and go inside several times’. He (the narrator) has said that the Imam then said: ‘You must not perform prayer after late evening prayer during the times other than the month of Ramadan’. [ِAl-Kafi by Al-Kulayni, vol. 4, p. 154-155, declared SAHIH by Majlisi in his Mir’ah Al-‘Uqul 16/378a] 

Muhammad al-Bukhari narrated regarding the Tarawih prayer in Sahih al-Bukhari:

Instead, Twelvers believe in the Tahajjud prayer or Salat al-Layl ("night prayer"), which is recommended throughout the year, especially during the nights of Ramadan.

Other
On 3 January 2000, Malaysian Prime Minister Mahathir Mohamad has expressed regret that tarawih prayers are being made use of by certain people for political gains.

See also
All-night vigil in Orthodox Christianity

References

Further reading
John L. Esposito: The Oxford Dictionary of Islam. Oxford University Press US 2004, p. 276

External links

Fasting in Islam
Salah
Ramadan
Salah terminology